Nune may refer to:

People
 Nune Hairapetian (born 1951), Armenian musician
 Nune Popović (born 1974), Serbian activist
 Nune Siravyan (born 1973), Armenian artist
 Nune Tumanyan (born 1963), Armenian artist
 Nune Yesayan, Armenian singer

Other
 Nune (crater), on Mars